The Ambassadors of Death is the third serial of the seventh season of the British science fiction television series Doctor Who, which was first broadcast in seven weekly parts on BBC1 from 21 March to 2 May 1970. Written by Trevor Ray, Terrance Dicks and Malcolm Hulke (though solely credited to David Whitaker), the serial was directed by Michael Ferguson.

The serial is set in London, Hertfordshire and the Earth's orbit. In the serial, the alien time traveller the Third Doctor (Jon Pertwee) and the international organisation UNIT investigate the disappearance of astronauts who have lost contact with Earth. They become involved in a conspiracy and meet alien ambassadors who have arrived on Earth.

Plot
The United Nations Intelligence Taskforce attempts to make contact with the missing Mars Probe Seven and its two astronauts, who lost contact with Earth eight months earlier. When the recovery crew returns to earth, it is captured by General Charles Carrington, who has captured the missing astronauts. Carrington is now introduced to the Doctor by Sir James Quinlan, the Minister for Technology, as head of the newly formed Space Security Department. Carrington says his actions were to protect the astronauts, as they have been infected with contagious radiation. Quinlan states the government did not want the public to become panic-stricken and reveals that Carrington has been acting with government authority. The Doctor believes the real astronauts are still in orbit, and that the three space suits contain alien beings.

An intelligent but ruthless criminal named Reegan engineers the kidnapping of Liz Shaw to aid his own scientist, Lennox, in keeping the aliens alive. Reegan sends the creatures to the Space Centre to kill Quinlan. Liz helps Lennox escape, and he tries to reach the Brigadier, but Reegan finds and kills him.

Cornish is determined to launch another spacecraft to retrieve his astronauts from the Mars Probe capsule in Earth orbit. The Doctor volunteers to pilot the rocket himself, but the rocket is taken prisoner by an alien spaceship. Aboard the craft, an alien being explains the humans are being held pending the safe return of the alien ambassadors, who have been sent to Earth to make peaceful contact with mankind. The Doctor gives his personal guarantee to return the ambassadors safely.

When the Doctor touches down, he is kidnapped by Reegan, who reunites him with Liz. Reegan's paymaster, and the real organiser of the situation, is revealed: General Carrington. The General has lured the three aliens to Earth in order to expose them on television and intends to call on the nations of the world to attack them. The use of the ambassadors to kill was done simply to arouse public opinion against them.

The Doctor manages to send a radio message, and the Brigadier and UNIT soldiers rescue him and Liz, arresting Reegan. They race to the Space Centre, where the Brigadier arrests Carrington. The Doctor arranges for Ralph Cornish and Liz to return the ambassadors to their own people so that the three human astronauts can be released.

Production
The opening titles of this story start with the normal music and graphics, yet immediately fade after the Doctor Who title caption. There is a short "teaser" for episode one, and episodes 2–7 feature a reprise of the previous episode's cliffhanger. This is followed by a "scream", accompanied by a zoom-in on the words "The Ambassadors", concluding with "of Death", and a "zap" effect. The experiment was not repeated after this story. This was the first story to feature the sting or "scream" into the end title theme. It was added by Brian Hodgson of the BBC Radiophonic Workshop to improve and shape the closing credits.

Location filming took place during January and February 1970 at Blue Circle Cement in Kent, Marlow Lock in Buckinghamshire, Southall Gas Works in Middlesex, and various sites in Aldershot, Hampshire. Studio recording then took place during February and March 1970. The alien underneath the spacesuit was achieved by layering the actor's face with blue make-up, tissue and latex rubber. Because it was uncomfortable for the actors, the make-up was applied shortly before they had to go on set. As the story was supposed to take place in the late 1970s, the spacesuit was designed as a futuristic version. Roy Scammell performed as a stunt double for Caroline John when she is pursued in Bessie and captured on the weir. Her husband, Geoffrey Beevers, briefly appears as a UNIT radio operator, credited as "Private Johnson".

Cast notes
In episodes 5 and 7, John Levene reprises the role of UNIT member Benton, now promoted to Sergeant, who had first been seen in the season 6-story The Invasion. Benton became a semi-regular character from this story onwards. Ronald Allen had appeared the previous season as one of the eponymous antagonists in The Dominators (1968). John Abineri had previously appeared in the season 5-story Fury from the Deep and later appeared in both Death to the Daleks in season 11 and The Power of Kroll in season 16. Michael Wisher appeared on screen in Terror of the Autons (1971) and Carnival of Monsters (1973), as well as being one of the regular Dalek voice artists during the Pertwee era, before becoming the first actor to play Davros in Genesis of the Daleks (1975). Geoffrey Beevers later played the Master in The Keeper of Traken (1981) and a number of Big Finish Productions audio plays. William Dysart had previously appeared in The Highlanders (1967). Peter Halliday, who provided the voices of the aliens, and also supplied the voices of the Silurians in the previous story, had first appeared in Doctor Who in The Invasion the previous season, and later appeared in Carnival of Monsters (alongside Michael Wisher), City of Death (1979) and Remembrance of the Daleks (1988). Cyril Shaps previously played Viner in The Tomb of the Cybermen (1967), and subsequently appeared with Jon Pertwee in Planet of the Spiders (1974) and with Tom Baker in The Androids of Tara (1978).

Broadcast and reception

Cultural historian James Chapman has written about connections between this Doctor Who serial and earlier science-fiction TV programmes. The Quatermass Experiment (1953), for example, has a similar storyline concerning astronauts endangering humanity after coming into contact with extraterrestrials. Chapman also refers to the 1960s Gerry Anderson series Captain Scarlet and the Mysterons, whose eponymous aliens are a race of malevolent Martians.

Patrick Mulkern of Radio Times noted that the script revisions caused an "uneven plot" and anticlimax, and wrote that the "narrative feels extemporised, a bumpy, sometimes thrilling ride, but one with no clear end in sight". However, he praised the cliffhangers and direction as well as the acting of Pertwee and John. The A.V. Club reviewer Christopher Bahn stated that The Ambassadors of Death was the "weakest" entry in a very good season, noting that it "spins its wheels" in the middle, but filled the time with impressive stunts. He felt that the problem was that Carrington's motivation was not revealed until the cliffhanger of the sixth episode, despite it being obvious since the first episode. Ian Berriman, reviewing the DVD release for SFX, gave the serial three out of five stars. He described it as a "hit and miss", finding the early episodes "promising" but then he felt the story did not have enough plot to carry on for seven episodes, and keeping track of the conspiracy between the various characters was "tedious and confusing". DVD Talk's John Sinnot rated The Ambassadors of Death three stars out of five, describing it as a "generally fun adventure" despite it being a couple of episodes too long. He was positive towards the Doctor's characterisation and the Ambassadors, who he described as "a great low-budget creature that actually looks more menacing than silly", but felt "there are a few too many plot twists and the result is a script with some pretty major holes in it".

Commercial releases

In print
A novelisation of this serial, written by Terrance Dicks, was published by Target Books in October 1987.

Home media
Although the entire story was made on colour videotape, only the first episode was retained in this format. In fact, it is the earliest episode that survives in the series' original videotaped format, either in colour or black and white. The remaining six episodes were retained only as black-and-white film recordings and poor-quality domestic colour recordings made from a US transmission in the 1970s. This recording was severely affected by rainbow-coloured patterns of interference that at times overtook the entire picture.

In May 2002, a restoration project for the story's VHS release combined the usable colour information from the domestic recordings with the black and white picture from the film prints, creating a high-quality colour picture. All told, over half of the serial's running time was presented in colour, including all of episodes 1 and 5, and sections from 2, 3, 6 and 7. The remaining footage, including all of episode 4, was deemed unsuitable for restoration, and so remained in black-and-white.

The January 2011 edition of Wired UK magazine, published in December 2010 carried a full-page article on the recolourisation of the story. It was stated in the article that the Restoration Team expected to deliver a fully restored colour version of the story to the BBC "within weeks". In issue 430 of Doctor Who Magazine the DVD was announced but later set back due to restoration difficulties. The release was delayed until 2012 when Doctor Who Magazine issue 449 confirmed that the full-colour version would soon be out on DVD. It was later announced that the story would be released on DVD on 1 October 2012. Among the special features on the DVD is a documentary entitled Mars Probe 7: Making The Ambassadors of Death. Although David Whitaker is the sole credited writer on the actual episodes, the DVD sleeve credits The Ambassadors of Death as being written by David Whitaker, Malcolm Hulke and Trevor Ray.

The original soundtrack for this serial was released on CD in the UK in August 2009. The linking narration was provided by Caroline John.

Critical analysis 
A book length study of the serial, written by LM Myles, was published as part of The Black Archive series from Obverse Books in 2016.

The serial was covered in number 15 of the Doctor Who: The Complete History book series, which reprinted Andrew Pixley's Archive features from Doctor Who Magazine and the various Doctor Who Magazine Special Editions, as well as new articles created specifically for the book.

References

Further reading

External links

 
 Doctor Who Locations – The Ambassadors of Death

Target novelisation
 
 On Target — The Ambassadors of Death

1970 British television episodes
Doctor Who serials novelised by Terrance Dicks
Third Doctor serials
Works about astronauts